Pneumospiruridae is a family of nematodes belonging to the order Rhabditida.

Genera:
 Metathelazia Skinker, 1931
 Pneumospirura Wu & Hu, 1938
 Vogeloides Orlov, Davtian & Lubimov, 1933

References

Nematodes